Royal Villette Charleroi is a Belgian table tennis club in Charleroi.

It is the second most successful club in the European Champions League with 5 European titles and 4-second-place finishes.

References

External links
Official website

Sports clubs in Belgium
Sport in Charleroi